Hoskonen is a Finnish surname. Notable people with the surname include:

Arttu Hoskonen (born 1997), Finnish footballer
Hannu Hoskonen (born 1957), Finnish politician

See also
Honkonen

Finnish-language surnames